A Fortunate number, named after Reo Fortune, is the smallest integer m > 1 such that, for a given positive integer n, pn# + m is a prime number, where the primorial pn# is the product of the first n prime numbers.

For example, to find the seventh Fortunate number, one would first calculate the product of the first seven primes (2, 3, 5, 7, 11, 13 and 17), which is 510510. Adding 2 to that gives another even number, while adding 3 would give another multiple of 3. One would similarly rule out the integers up to 18. Adding 19, however, gives 510529, which is prime. Hence 19 is a Fortunate number. The Fortunate number for pn# is always above pn and all its divisors are larger than pn. This is because pn#, and thus pn# + m, is divisible by the prime factors of m not larger than pn.

The Fortunate numbers for the first primorials are:
3, 5, 7, 13, 23, 17, 19, 23, 37, 61, 67, 61, 71, 47, 107, 59, 61, 109, etc. .

The Fortunate numbers sorted in numerical order with duplicates removed:
3, 5, 7, 13, 17, 19, 23, 37, 47, 59, 61, 67, 71, 79, 89, 101, 103, 107, 109, 127, 151, 157, 163, 167, 191, 197, 199, ... .

Fortune conjectured that no Fortunate number is composite (Fortune's conjecture).  A Fortunate prime is a Fortunate number which is also a prime number. , all the known Fortunate numbers are prime. A composite Fortunate number, if one exists, would have to be greater than or equal to pn+12.

References

 Chris Caldwell, "The Prime Glossary: Fortunate number" at the Prime Pages.
 

Integer sequences
Prime numbers